Annabel Jäger (born 6 January 1994) is a German football midfielder, currently playing for Cloppenburg in the 1. Bundesliga.

As an Under-17 international, she played the 2011 U-17 European Championship where she was the tournament's top joint scorer with teammate Lina Magull.

References

1994 births
Living people
German women's footballers
VfL Wolfsburg (women) players
Women's association football midfielders
People from Gütersloh
Sportspeople from Detmold (region)
Footballers from North Rhine-Westphalia